Livonia Rock is a rock lying  south of Cape Melville, the eastern extremity of King George Island, in the South Shetland Islands, Antarctica. It was named by the UK Antarctic Place-Names Committee in 1960 for the sealing vessel Livonia from London, which visited the South Shetland Islands in 1821–22.

References

Rock formations of King George Island (South Shetland Islands)